The 2018 NBL season was the 37th season of the National Basketball League. In 2018, the league welcomed back the Manawatu Jets after a two-season hiatus.

The regular season commenced on Thursday 26 April in Napier with the Hawke's Bay Hawks hosting the Southland Sharks at Pettigrew Green Arena. The season contained 14 weeks of regular season games followed by a Final Four weekend in August. The competition included a one-week international break, from 25 June to 1 July, and started later than normal due to the Gold Coast Commonwealth Games.

Team information

Summary

Regular season standings

Final Four

Awards

Player of the Week

Statistics leaders
Stats as of the end of the regular season

Regular season
 Most Valuable Player: Shea Ili (Wellington Saints)
 NZ Most Valuable Player: Shea Ili (Wellington Saints)
 Most Outstanding Guard: Shea Ili (Wellington Saints)
 Most Outstanding NZ Guard: Shea Ili (Wellington Saints)
 Most Outstanding Forward: Finn Delany (Nelson Giants)
 Most Outstanding NZ Forward/Centre: Finn Delany (Nelson Giants)
 Scoring Champion: Daishon Knight (Manawatu Jets)
 Rebounding Champion: Kuran Iverson (Manawatu Jets)
 Assist Champion: Lindsay Tait (Super City Rangers)
 Rookie of the Year: Max Darling (Canterbury Rams)
 Coach of the Year: Jamie Pearlman (Nelson Giants)
 All-Star Five:
 G: Shea Ili (Wellington Saints)
 G: Jarrad Weeks (Southland Sharks)
 F: Winston Shepard (Canterbury Rams)
 F: Finn Delany (Nelson Giants)
 C: Angus Brandt (Hawke's Bay Hawks)

Final Four
 Finals MVP: Reuben Te Rangi (Southland Sharks)

References

External links
2018 draw
2018 season preview
2018 final regular season stats

National Basketball League (New Zealand) seasons
NBL